Křešín is a municipality and village in Pelhřimov District in the Vysočina Region of the Czech Republic. It has about 200 inhabitants.

Administrative parts
Villages and hamlets of Blažnov, Čeněnice, Kramolín and Mohelnice administrative parts of Křešín.

References

Villages in Pelhřimov District